Dayton Mercantile, is a historic building situated at 408 Main St. in Dayton in Sheridan County, Wyoming. It was added to the National Register of Historic Places in 2016.

It is a two-story wood-frame building built as a commercial general store in 1882 by Henry Baker, and enlarged to the rear in 1901 by Henry Croghan.  Croghan opened a ballroom on the second floor called Croghan's Hall.

References

External links
 Dayton Mercantile at the Wyoming State Historic Preservation Office

Commercial buildings on the National Register of Historic Places in Wyoming
Sheridan County, Wyoming
Buildings and structures completed in 1882